Robert McCracken Keyes (1910–1970) was a Scottish footballer who played for Morton and Falkirk, mainly as a centre forward. He signed for Falkirk in January 1935, with the club being relegated at the end of that season; however he scored 30 goals from 25 appearances as the Bairns won the 1935–36 Scottish Division Two title to reclaim their place in the top tier, and then amassed a further 54 goals in 58 games over the next two seasons as they consolidated their place in Division One. His career was curtailed by the outbreak of World War II, during which he played in unofficial competitions with Falkirk for 18 months, then for two years with Motherwell.

Keyes was selected once for the Scottish Football League XI in 1939 (two days before the war began), scoring one of the goals in a 3–2 win over the Irish League.

References

1910 births
1970 deaths
Footballers from Bellshill
Association football forwards
Scottish footballers
Larkhall Thistle F.C. players
Falkirk F.C. players
Motherwell F.C. players
Greenock Morton F.C. players
Scottish Junior Football Association players
Scottish Football League players
Scottish Football League representative players